Pelatiah Webster Perit (June 23, 1785 – March 8, 1864) was a prominent New York merchant and banker.

Early life

Perit was born on June 23, 1785, in Norwich, Connecticut and named after his maternal grandfather, Pelatiah Webster. He was the son of Capt. John Perit and Ruth Kellogg (née Webster) Perit. Among his siblings were John Webster Perit (married to Margaretta Dunlap), Maria Perit (wife of Charles Phelps Huntington), and Rebecca Hunt Perit (wife of Joshua Hubbard Lathrop). After his father died in 1795, his mother married Christopher Leffingwell in 1799.
He graduated from Yale College with the class of 1802.

Career
He served as president of the Chamber of Commerce of the State of New York from 1853 to 1863, and was a commissioner of police in 1857. He served as president of the Seamen's Savings Bank, and was an original incorporator and director of the Bank of Commerce in New York.

Personal life
Perit was twice married. His first marriage was to Jerusha Lathrop, the sister of his brother-in-law, on September 6, 1809. After her death, he married Maria Coit (1793–1885) on October 8, 1823. Maria was a daughter of Daniel Lathrop Coit. In 1860, Perit had architect Sidney Mason Stone design him a Renaissance Revival style Italian villa in New Haven.

Perit died at his residence in New Haven, Connecticut in March 1864.

References

External links
Pelatiah Perit (1785-1864), B. A. 1802 at Yale University Art Gallery

1785 births
1864 deaths
Yale University alumni
American merchants
American bankers
People from Norwich, Connecticut
People from New Haven, Connecticut